Mahendra Singh Sisodia is an Indian politician and a member of the Bharatiya Janata Party. He is one of the 22 MLAs who resigned amid political crisis in Madhya Pradesh favouring Jyotiraditya Scindia.

Political career

In December 2018, he was inducted into the Kamal Nath cabinet as Minister of Labour in Madhya Pradesh. During 2020 Madhya Pradesh political crisis, he supported senior Congress leader Jyotiraditya Scindia and was one of the 22 MLAs who resigned.

Personal life
He is married to Smt. Shivaraje Singh.

See also
Madhya Pradesh Legislative Assembly
2013 Madhya Pradesh Legislative Assembly election
2008 Madhya Pradesh Legislative Assembly election

References

External links

Madhya Pradesh MLAs 2008–2013
1964 births
Living people
Indian National Congress politicians from Madhya Pradesh
Madhya Pradesh MLAs 2018–2023
Bharatiya Janata Party politicians from Madhya Pradesh